Domingo Arévalo (born 15 September 1968) is a Paraguayan footballer who played for clubs from Paraguay, Argentina and Chile and for the Paraguay national team.

References
 Profile at BDFA 

1968 births
Living people
Paraguayan footballers
Paraguayan expatriate footballers
Estudiantes de La Plata footballers
River Plate (Asunción) footballers
Club Sol de América footballers
Club Olimpia footballers
Puerto Montt footballers
Santiago Wanderers footballers
Chilean Primera División players
Argentine Primera División players
Expatriate footballers in Chile
Expatriate footballers in Argentina
Association football forwards